The 1919 Furman Baptists football team represented Furman University during the 1919 Southern Intercollegiate Athletic Association football season. Led by fifth-year head coach Billy Laval, Furman compiled an overall record of 6–2–1 with a mark of 2–1–1 in SIAA play.

Schedule

References

Furman
Furman Paladins football seasons
Furman Baptists football